Live... In the Still of the Night is a live concert DVD by the band Whitesnake. The concert was filmed on 20 October 2004 at the Hammersmith Apollo in London. It was released in 2006 featuring most of Whitesnake's biggest hits. The limited edition includes a bonus CD with selected songs from the same show.

Reception

The DVD received positive reviews. Bret Adams of AllMusic rated the DVD a 4.5 out of 5, stating that "the band glides along as a tight ensemble more than you think." Avi Shaked of Maelstrom webzine gave it a 9 out of 10, noting that "the show holds a real pleasure for Whitesnake fans."

At the 2006 Classic Rock Roll of Honour Awards ceremony, the DVD won the award for "DVD of the Year."

Track listing
"Burn" (David Coverdale, Ritchie Blackmore, Jon Lord, Ian Paice)
"Bad Boys" (Coverdale, John Sykes)
"Love Ain't No Stranger" (Coverdale, Mel Galley)
"Ready an' Willing" (Coverdale, Micky Moody, Neil Murray, Lord, Paice)
"Is This Love" (Coverdale, Sykes)
"Give Me All Your Love" (Coverdale, Sykes)
"Judgement Day" (Coverdale, Adrian Vandenberg)
"Blues for Mylene" (Doug Aldrich)
"Snake Dance" (Coverdale, Aldrich)
"Crying in the Rain" (Coverdale)
"Drum Solo" (Tommy Aldridge)
"Crying in the Rain" (Coverdale)
"Ain't No Love in the Heart of the City" (Michael Price, Dan Walsh)
"Don't Break My Heart Again"  (Coverdale)
"Fool for Your Loving" (Coverdale, Moody, Bernie Marsden)
"Here I Go Again" (Coverdale, Marsden)
"Take Me with You" (Coverdale, Moody)
"Still of the Night" (Coverdale, Sykes)
"Credits"

"Plus special Bonus backstage footage and interview with the band."

Personnel
 David Coverdale - lead vocals
 Doug Aldrich - guitar, backing vocals
 Reb Beach - guitar, backing vocals
 Timothy Drury - keyboards, backing vocals
 Marco Mendoza - bass, backing vocals
 Tommy Aldridge - drums

Charts

Certifications

References

External links
 Doug Aldrich's official website

2006 live albums
2006 video albums
Whitesnake live albums
Live video albums
Whitesnake video albums
Hip-O Records live albums
AFM Records video albums
Albums recorded at the Hammersmith Apollo
Live hard rock albums
Live heavy metal albums